John Curtin House Limited is a Canberra-based holding company owned by the Australian Labor Party (ALP), named after John Curtin House, a building in Barton, Canberra which was the former headquarters of the Australian Labor Party (ALP). The building is in turn named after the former Labor Prime Minister (1941–1945) and Fremantle MP (1928–1931; 1934–1945) John Curtin.

In 2002–2003, John Curtin House gave $1,235,000 to the Australian Labor Party, making it the ALP's single largest donor.

From 1992 to 2005, John Curtin House Limited was involved in a controversial scheme where the Australian National Audit Office paid above-market rent for premises at Centenary House, at a profit to the Labor Party.

Critics say John Curtin House Limited exists as a front to hide the identities of donors to the Australian Labor Party.

See also
 Centenary House
 Cormack Foundation
 Political donations in Australia
 Campaign finance

References

Investment companies of Australia
Political funding